The La Paz incident occurred on May 20, 1863 at the mining town of La Paz, Arizona, and was the westernmost armed confrontation of the American Civil War. William "Frog" Edwards, only recently released from detention at Fort Yuma, ambushed a party of unarmed Union soldiers when they stopped at La Paz to purchase supplies. Edwards' attack killed one soldier instantly and left another mortally wounded. Edwards then fled into the desert where he died of exposure and dehydration.

Incident
After the Confederates established their own Arizona Territory at Mesilla, New Mexico, in February 1862, the Union sent the California Column east to reinforce the Union Army engaged in the New Mexico Campaign. Confederate cavalry briefly occupied Tucson from February 28 until early May 1862, but withdrew soon after the skirmish at Picacho Peak. The following year General James H. Carleton arrested several California secessionists bound for Texas and detained them at Fort Yuma; William "Frog" Edwards was one of these detainees. La Paz was one of a handful of mining settlements that had been established along the Colorado River. It was situated along an important army supply route that had been in use since the Yuma War. The army used the Colorado River to supply garrisons in Arizona. On the evening of May 20, 1863, the Colorado River steamer Cocopah arrived at La Paz en route to Fort Mohave. A small party of soldiers, under the command of Lieutenant James A. Hale of the 4th California Infantry, disembarked to purchase supplies at Cohn's Store.

Lurking in the shadows was William "Frog" Edwards, only recently released from jail at Fort Yuma. As the soldiers approached the store, Edwards opened fire with his revolver. Private Ferdinand Behn was killed instantly, Private Truston Wentworth was mortally wounded and died the following day, Private Thomas Gainor was severely wounded, but recovered. One bystander was also struck and suffered a serious wound. Lieutenant Hale immediately searched the town with his remaining men but did not find Edwards. Lieutenant Hale returned to Fort Yuma aboard the Cocopah with his dead and wounded the following day. In response to Edwards' attack, a troop of forty men was deployed to hunt him down. Edwards was found several days later in the desert, where he apparently died of exposure and dehydration.

See also
St. Albans Raid
Stanwix Station

Notes

References

Arizona folklore
Military operations of the American Civil War in Arizona
Colorado River
Combat incidents
Deaths by firearm in Arizona
History of La Paz County, Arizona
History of the Southwestern United States
1863 in Arizona Territory
May 1863 events